Sir William Scott (d. 1350s) was an English lawyer, and Chief Justice of the King's Bench from 8 January 1341 to 26 November 1346. Originally from Yorkshire – probably Birthwaite in Kexbrough – Scott as Chief Justice presided over trials resulting from Edward III's purge of the administration the previous years. Among those tried was William de la Pole. After retiring from this position, Scott largely withdrew from public life, probably because of ill health. He returned to Yorkshire to attend to his estates. The Oxford Dictionary of National Biography says that he "was still alive on 10 March 1352...but was certainly dead by 11 May 1356, and probably by 1354".

Sources

Lord chief justices of England and Wales
1350s deaths
Justices of the King's Bench
Year of birth unknown